Hummer is a video game developed by Sega AM2 and published by Sega for the arcade.

Gameplay
Hummer is a first-person light-gun game in which the player's hummer drives through the enemy and tries to destroy everything they have.

Reception
Next Generation reviewed the arcade version of the game, rating it two stars out of five, and stated that "Sega's megahit arcade team may crank out lots of great games (and no one does it better), but Hummer [...] is one that definitely fell through the cracks."

References

Arcade video games